La Virgen gitana is a 1951 Spanish comedy film directed by Ramón Torrado. It was entered into the 1951 Cannes Film Festival.

Plot 
Carmen (Paquita Rico) is a gypsy orphan girl. One day she meets painter Eduardo Miranda (Alfredo Mayo), who asks her to pose for him for a picture of Debla, the gypsy virgin. She falls in love with the painter, not knowing he is married. But soon people begin to talk.

Cast
 Paquita Rico as Carmelilla
 Alfredo Mayo as Eduardo Miranda
 Lina Yegros as Cristina Álvarez de Miranda
 Lola Ramos as Reyes
 Alfonso Estela as Vicente
 Félix Fernández as Miguel
 Modesto Cid as Agustín
 María Severini
 Rosa Fontsere (as Rosa Fontseré)
 Camino Delgado
 Pedro Mascaró
 Ana Morera
 Fortunato García as Juez

References

External links

1951 films
1950s Spanish-language films
1951 comedy films
Films directed by Ramón Torrado
Spanish comedy films
1950s Spanish films